Donduran, Yenipazar is a village in the District of Yenipazar, Aydın Province, Turkey. As of 2010 it had a population of 1155 people.

References

Villages in Yenipazar District